More Than Local is Benjy Davis Project's debut album. It was released on June 11, 2002. It included songs that became staples of the band's live shows, including "The Day That I Die" and "Louisiana Saturday Night".

Track listing
All songs composed by Benjy Davis except as noted.
 "More Than Local" – 3:27
 "The Day That I Die" - 3:19
 "Louisiana Saturday Night" - 3:13
 "Humble Hand" - 3:40
 "Glory Glory" - 3:42
 "No More Pills" - 3:49
 "Interlude" (Benjy Davis/Chris Spinosa) - 2:28
 "Heaven Never Seemed So Small" - 4:14
 "Cajun Crawfish Boil" - 3:16
 "Where My Ass Is" - 3:53
 "Where The Heart Is" - 4:11
 "To Your Door" - 3:39
 "I Don't Mind" - 2:07
 "Never Go Away" - 4:21
 "Sleep Sweetly" - 3:14

Personnel
 Benjy Davis - Acoustic Guitar, Lead Vocals
 Brett Bolden - Bass Guitar
 Mic Capdevielle - Drums
 Michael Galasso - Background Vocals
 Anthony Rushing - Background Vocals
 Chris Spinosa - Electric Guitar

Additional personnel
 Clarence "Gatemouth" Brown - Lead Guitar, Fiddle
 Susan Cowsill - Background Vocals
 Paul Sanchez - Lead Guitar
 Darrell Brown - Hammond B-3
 David Peters - Percussion, Rain Stick, Shakers, Triangle
 Pat Robinson - Electric Guitar, Harmonica, Background Vocals

References

Benjy Davis Project albums
2002 albums